Erik de la Rose (born June 9, 1993) is a Swedish professional ice hockey defenceman, who plays for Vítkovice of the Czech ELH.

Personal 
Erik's brother, Jacob had a brief stint in the National Hockey League.

References

External links 
 

1993 births
Almtuna IS players
Leksands IF players
Lillehammer IK players
Living people
Storhamar Dragons players
Swedish ice hockey defencemen
Swedish expatriate ice hockey players in Norway